Holiday is a British television programme, which aired mainly on BBC One, and sometimes on BBC Two. It is the longest running travel review series on UK television, showing every year from 1969 until its demise in 2007.

Overview
The programme began in 1969 as Holiday 69, and until the 1990s the year was included in the title in this way. The first presenter was Cliff Michelmore, who remained with the series until 1986. In 1974, competitor network ITV launched its own travel show, Wish You Were Here...?, which ran until 2003.

Each week the programme consisted of reports made by presenters visiting holiday resorts and destinations in both the UK or overseas. The locations would be reviewed based on criteria such as amenities, attractions, and hospitality. Despite the programme's interesting locations and resorts, it garnered a reputation for featuring destinations that the majority of viewers would be unable to afford.

The programme spawned several short-lived offshoot programmes, including Summer Holiday (1994–2002); Holiday: Fasten Your Seatbelt (1996–98), in which presenters tried out holiday-related jobs); Holiday: You Call the Shots – in which viewers advised the presenters which sites to visit in a particular destination prior to filming (2001–03); and Holiday on a Shoestring (1999).

It was announced by the BBC in November 2006 that after 37 years and 40 series, Holiday would end in March 2007 at the conclusion of its current run.

Presenters
Many presenters appeared in the programme, including Cliff Michelmore, Ginny Buckley, Joan Bakewell, Anne Gregg, Frank Bough, Desmond Lynam, Eamonn Holmes, Anneka Rice, Jill Dando, Rizwana Lateef, Craig Doyle and Nana Akua.

In addition, the teams of reporters who provided regular reviews from holiday destinations included Sarah Kennedy, Bill Buckley, Kieran Prendiville, Fyfe Robertson, Kathy Tayler, Monty Don, Rowland Rivron, John Cole and Carol Smillie. The final presenter was Laurence Llewelyn-Bowen.

Theme tunes
The original theme tune for the series was Love's "The Castle".

Subsequent theme tunes in the mid-1970s included Hugo Montenegro's arrangement of Lalo Schifrin's theme to the 1968 movie The Fox, a cover of the Beatles song "Here Comes the Sun", and Part Five of Jean Michel Jarre's Équinoxe.

Gordon Giltrap's "Heartsong" was used as a theme tune from 1978 until the end of the 1985 series. In 1986 it was replaced with "The Holiday Suite" written by Simon May, who also composed the EastEnders theme. This proved unpopular, and was replaced the following year by a further Giltrap composition.

In 1988 Paul Hardcastle composed new music, titled "The Voyager". This theme was used throughout the 1990s and 2000s until the programme came to an end after 37 years in 2007.

Transmissions

Holiday

Holiday Quiz

Summer Holiday

Holiday: Fasten Your Seatbelt

Holiday Heaven

Holiday Memories
Celebrity Holiday Memories in 1999

Holiday Guide to....

Holiday on a Shoestring

Holiday Swaps

Holiday: You Call the Shots

Specials

References

External links

1969 British television series debuts
2007 British television series endings
1960s British travel television series
1970s British travel television series
1980s British travel television series
1990s British travel television series
2000s British travel television series
BBC television documentaries
BBC travel television series
English-language television shows